Sant'Anna d'Alfaedo is a comune (municipality) in the Province of Verona in the Italian region Veneto, located about  west of Venice and about  north of Verona.

The municipality of Sant'Anna d'Alfaedo contains the frazioni (subdivisions, mainly villages and hamlets) Ronconi, Fosse, Giare, Cerna, Sant'Anna, and Ceredo.

Sant'Anna d'Alfaedo borders the following municipalities: Ala, Avio, Dolcè, Erbezzo, Fumane, Grezzana, Marano di Valpolicella, and Negrar.

Demographic evolution

References

External links
 www.baldolessinia.it/santanna/

Cities and towns in Veneto